Kose Airfield (ICAO: EEKO) is an airfield in Kose Parish, Harju County, Estonia.

The airfield's owner manager is Tiit Viirelaid.

References

Airports in Estonia
Buildings and structures in Harju County
Kose Parish